Rem or REM may refer to:

Music
 R.E.M., an American rock band
 R.E.M. (EP), by the band Green
 "R.E.M." (song), by Ariana Grande

Science and technology
 Rapid eye movement sleep, a phase of sleep
 Roentgen equivalent man (rem), a unit of radiation dose equivalent
 REM (BASIC), an inline comment (REMark) in BASIC and some other computer languages
 Rare-earth metal
 Reflection electron microscope
 Reticular erythematous mucinosis, a skin disease
 Root em, a font-size measurement used with Cascading Style Sheets
 Real ear measurement, measurement of sound pressure level in a patient's ear canal developed when a hearing aid is worn

Organizations
 La République En Marche!, a French centrist political party
 Reichserziehungsministerium, in Nazi Germany, unofficially known as the Reich Education Ministry
 Reiss Engelhorn Museum, Germany
 Resource Extraction Monitoring, a UK-based non-profit organisation
 Rosicrucian Egyptian Museum, California, United States
 REM Island, an offshore platform and home of the pirate stations Radio and TV Noordzee

People
 Jakob Rem (1546–1618), Austrian Jesuit
 Rem Koolhaas (born 1944), Dutch architect
 Rem Vyakhirev (1934–2013), Russian manager
 Rem, pen name of Priscilla Hamby, illustrator and comic book artist

Fictional characters
 Rem, an android in Logan's Run
 Rem, in Dream Hunter Rem
 Rem Saverem, in Trigun
 Rem, in Bobobo-bo Bo-bobo
 Rem (Death Note), a Shinigami in Death Note
 Rem Kaginuki, a devil in Dance with Devils
 Rem (Re:Zero), a character in the light novel/anime series Re:Zero − Starting Life in Another World
 Rem Galleu, in How Not to Summon a Demon Lord

Other uses
 Rém, a village in Hungary
 Réseau express métropolitain, Greater Montreal rapid transit system
 REM (Real Estate Magazine), Canada
 Rem (mythology), an Egyptian fish god

See also
 REM World, a fantasy/science fiction novel by Rodman Philbrick
 Rems (disambiguation)